KDDX-class destroyer (KDX-IV) is a stealthy destroyer class under development by Hyundai Heavy Industries for ROK Navy, to be launched after 2025. Displacement of the class is set to be about 8,000 tons, length 155 meters, breadth 18.8 meters and draft 9.5 meters. Will feature KVLS to  launch Hyunmoo-3C land-attack cruise missiles and SSM-700K anti-ship tactical cruise missiles. At 8000 tons displacement, it will be lighter than Sejong the Great-class destroyers, but with more advanced sensors and stealth characteristics and lower operating costs. The ships will have advanced missile defense.  The  size  of  this  new  destroyer  will  be  between  that  of  the  currently operating 4,200-ton KDX-II and the Aegis Destroyer KDX-III, and will be assigned to a naval task force. The total cost of developing and producing the six vessels is expected to top $6.2 billion.

See also 
 Korean Destroyer eXperimental

References 

Destroyers of the Republic of Korea Navy
Proposed ships